Buddy's Lost World is a 1935 Warner Bros. Looney Tunes cartoon, directed by Jack King. The short was released on May 18, 1935, and stars Buddy, the second star of the series.

The title is likely a reference to the 1925 silent film The Lost World, itself based upon the 1912 novel by Sir Arthur Conan Doyle. The music playing throughout much of the cartoon is "Lullaby of Broadway", played in a minor key.

Summary
Captain Buddy leaves on a maritime expedition around the world as many adoring well-wishers cheer him on. The crowd stands on a dock, which is pulled apart as Buddy's motorboat, still tied to the structure, sails away, leaving the people floating in the water.

The story skips ahead in time, and Buddy & his companion Bozo the dog have found land. It is, as Buddy notes upon looking about and checking his map, the "Lost Island!" Buddy, in his excitement, leaves Bozo to sniff footprints that move away from him every time they are sniffed. This process takes Bozo through a forest, dominated, as we find, by a brontosaurus, whose discovery frightens the dog into a run. Bozo topples a cavelady jumproping, and encounters a caveman who seems to suppose himself a dog, as he digs up a bone and scurries off with it; Bozo finds a bone as well, which leads him to unearth an entire dinosaur skeleton! The dog becomes trapped within the skeleton's rib cage; Buddy sees this and flips his lid. By opening the mouth of the deceased dinosaur, Buddy is able to rescue his companion.

Buddy now spies, through some reeds, another peculiar fellow acting like a dog, and calls Bozo over to see. But, despite Buddy's injunctions to silence, Bozo's yelping scares the strange man away. The dog chases the fleeing fellow into a cave, in which both are then trapped. Buddy calls after Bozo and is eaten by a gigantic, ravenous plant, whose digestive tract leaves him on a hillside, overlooking a society of cavemen, some hard at work, others busying themselves with croquet. Our Hero decides to descend, and so slides down the neck of what happens to be a very friendly brontosaurus. We see then three Stooge-esque cavemen abusing each other; one indicates Bozo the dog, who is tied up very close by. The Stooge takes Bozo to what turns out to be the base of a cage. Buddy, hurrying away from his dinosaur friend in order to rescue Bozo, also becomes ensnared in the cage.

The story skips ahead in time again. Buddy and his companion are in a pot of water, presumably in order for them to be cooked. Two of the Lost Island's cave denizens perform an absurd dancing ritual that involves a good measure of abuse by clubs; the crowd of cave people watch as the ritual takes place. Buddy shouts for help, and is heard by none other than his brontosaurus friend from earlier. The approaching dinosaur scares off all of the cavemen, some of whom are further picked up by the great beast and thrown off-screen. The dinosaur then places Buddy and Bozo on its back. Giving his thanks, Buddy places his sailor's hat upon his new friend's head, and is licked affectionately by both of his animal friends.

References

External links
 
 

1935 films
1935 animated films
1930s American animated films
1930s animated short films
American black-and-white films
Films scored by Norman Spencer (composer)
Films directed by Jack King
Buddy (Looney Tunes) films
Films set on islands
Looney Tunes shorts
Films about cavemen
Animated films about cavemen
Animated films about dinosaurs